The San Diego Toreros men's basketball team is a college basketball team that represents the University of San Diego in San Diego, California. The school's team currently competes in the West Coast Conference (WCC). The team played in the NCAA Division I men's basketball tournament in 2008. The Toreros play their home games in the Jenny Craig Pavilion, and their head coach is Steve Lavin.

They won their first WCC title in 1983–84, when the conference was known as the West Coast Athletic Conference. The team was led by all-conference forward Mike Whitmarsh, who was a runner-up that year for the conference player of the year award. Their coach, Jim Brovelli, was named the conference coach of the year.

Rivalries 
University of San Diego's biggest rival is San Diego State University. Since the 2001–02 season the Toreros have been 3–15 against the Aztecs during the past 15 seasons, but led the series 10–9 prior to that (SDSU leads 23–14 all-time with both programs at the Division I level). As of the 2022–23 season, the last Toreros win came during the 2018–19 season at SDSU. They also won against them during a game at Petco Park during the 2015–16 season, at the time the fifth game since 2011 to be played outside; it was also the first time the Petco Park hosted a basketball game. The Toreros won 53–48.

College admissions scandal
Lamont Smith, who coached the team from 2015–2018, was accused of accepting a bribe as part of  the 2019 college admissions bribery scandal while he was coach of the team, allegedly illegally helping a Beverly Hills real estate developer's children gain admission to the university.

Postseason results

NCAA tournament results

The Toreros have appeared in four NCAA Tournaments. Their combined record is 1–4.

NIT results
The Toreros have appeared in the National Invitation Tournament (NIT) once, in 2019.

CIT results
The Toreros have appeared in the CollegeInsider.com Postseason Tournament (CIT) two times. Their combined record is 4–2.

Record by coach

¹ Invitations

Results by Season, Last 10 Years
2021–2022 (15-16) (7–9 Conference)
2020–2021 (3-11) (2-7 Conference)
2018–2019 (21–14) (7–9 Conference)
2017–2018 (20–14) (9–9 Conference)
2016–2017 (13–18) (6–12 Conference)
2015–2016 (9–21) (4–14 Conference)
2014–2015 (15–16) (8–10 Conference)
2013–2014 (18–17) (7–11 Conference)
2012–2013 (16–18) (7–9 Conference)
2011–2012 (13–18) (7–9 Conference)

Toreros in the NBA
Stan Washington
Eric Musselman
Mike Brown
Bernie Bickerstaff
David Fizdale
James Borrego
Chris Grant

References

External links